Mocis vitiensis is a moth of the family Erebidae first described by George Hampson in 1913. It is found in Fiji.

References

External links
"Mocis Hübner [1823] 1816 vitiensis Hampson 1913". Moths in Fiji. Archived September 27, 2011.

Moths described in 1913
Moths of Fiji
vitiensis